Camerata de'Bardi may refer to:

 Florentine Camerata, a group of humanists, musicians, poets and intellectuals in late Renaissance Florence, also known as the Camerata de' Bardi
Camerata de' Bardi (orchestra), an orchestra founded in 1989 at the University of Pavia in Italy